Saral District is a district (bakhsh) in Divandarreh County, Kurdistan Province, Iran. At the 2006 census, its population was 16,468, in 3,335 families.  The District has no cities. The District has three rural districts (dehestan): Hoseynabad-e Shomali Rural District, Kowleh Rural District, and Saral Rural District.

References 

Divandarreh County
Districts of Kurdistan Province